Latirus xantochrous is a species of sea snail, a marine gastropod mollusk in the family Fasciolariidae, the spindle snails, the tulip snails and their allies.

Description

Distribution
This species occurs in the Indian Ocean off Mauritius.

References

 Snyder, M.A & Callomon, P. (2015). Species named in Fasciolariidae by Tapparone-Canefri and their types (Mollusca: Gastropoda). Proceedings of the Academy of Natural Sciences of Philadelphia. 164(1): 37–41.

External links
 Tapparone Canefri, C. (1881). Glanures dans la faune malacologique de l'Ile Maurice. Catalogue de la famille des Muricidés. 100 pp., 2 pls.

Fasciolariidae
Gastropods described in 1880